The Lod Mosaic is a mosaic floor dated to ca. 300 CE discovered in 1996 in the Israeli town of Lod. Believed to  have been created for a private villa, it is one of the largest (180 m²) and best-preserved mosaic floors uncovered in the country. It depicts land animals, fish and two Roman ships. It was restored in the labs of the Israel Antiquities Authority (IAA). After an overseas tour of  several years it opened in the purpose-built Shelby White and Leon Levy Lod Mosaic Archaeological Center in June 2022.

History
The mosaic was discovered in 1996 by construction workers widening HeHalutz Street. Archaeologist Miriam Avissar of the Israel Antiquities Authority was called to the site. The mosaic was put on public view over a single weekend and 30,000 people traveled to Lod to see it. It was then reburied while funding was sought for its conservation.

The Leon Levy Foundation and Shelby White, wife of Leon Levy and Chairman of the Friends of the Israel Antiquities Authority, funded the conservation of the mosaic and the establishment of the Shelby White and Leon Levy Lod Mosaic Center. The mosaic has been on an exhibition tour to eleven museums around the world since 2010. While it is expected  to return to Lod for public display, the date has been repeatedly postponed, first from 2012/13 to 2014. The last exhibition outside Israel was scheduled to close in May 2016.  There are hopes that tourists coming to see the mosaic will increase the prosperity of Lod.

Description and analysis
The patterns depict birds, fish, animals and plants, in addition to providing detailed images of Roman-era ships. However, the mosaic also prominently feature rhinoceroses and giraffes, which were not common in ancient art. Mythical beings are also portrayed. Nothing is written on the mosaic; inscriptions are common in Roman-era mosaics from public buildings, so it is assumed that the mosaic was most likely part of a private villa.

Unusual for a mosaic floor of this age, the mosaic is in near-perfect condition. The exception is damage to one of the two ships depicted, done when an Ottoman-era cesspit was dug into the mosaic. Despite the damage, students of maritime history have been able to glean a great deal of information from the images. The ships are of the navis oneraria type, Roman merchant ships typically displacing 80-150 tons, used to carry such commodities as garum and grain from Egypt to Rome.

Archaeologists Elie Haddad and Miriam Avissar suggest that the absence of human figures, rare in Roman-era mosaics, may indicate that the mosaic was commissioned by a Jew who observed the Biblical prohibition of graven images.  They further suggest that it may have been commissioned as a kind of ex-voto, a thank offering in fulfillment of a vow made upon being delivered from grave danger, in this case, shipwreck.  Other maritime historians demur, but Haddad and Avissar point to what appear to be torn ropes, a broken mast and damaged steering oars, together with the central placement of the damaged ship in the mosaic and the fact that it is apparently about to be swallowed by a giant fish as an artists representation of disaster at sea.

See also
Archaeology of Israel

References

External links 
 The official website of the Lod Mosaic exhibition tour 2010-2016
 Article about the Lod Mosaic by Metropolitan Museum of Art Curator, Christopher S. Lightfoot
 Artist & Scholar Lillian Sizemore discusses the Lod Mosaic and how ancient Greeks and Romans used the geometric shapes they saw in nature as a foundation for learning by Kathryn Kukula
 Video clip The Lod Mosaic: From Excavation to Exhibition (Jaques Neguer, Director of Art Conservation, Israel Antiquities Authority) on The Metropolitan Museum of Art YouTube channel
 Video clip The Lod Mosaic Floor and Its Menagerie: Roman Influence on Local Mosaic Art (Miriam Avissar, senior archaeologist with Israel Antiquities Authority) on The Metropolitan Museum of Art YouTube channel

Archaeological sites in Israel
Archaeological museums in Israel
1996 archaeological discoveries
Votive offering
Lod
Museums in Central District (Israel)
Israeli mosaics
Ships in art
Animals in art
Roman mosaics
3rd century in art